Owen Roizman (September 22, 1936 – January 6, 2023) was an American cinematographer. He received five Academy Award nominations for Best Cinematography, for the films The French Connection (1971), The Exorcist (1973), Network (1976), Tootsie (1982), and Wyatt Earp (1994). He served on the Board of Governors of the Academy of Motion Picture Arts and Sciences and was president of the American Society of Cinematographers.

His first feature film was Stop (1970), and several other notable credits include The Heartbreak Kid (1972), Three Days of the Condor (1975), Absence of Malice (1981), True Confessions (1981), The Addams Family (1991), and Grand Canyon (1991). He is known for his "gritty" style and received an Academy Honorary Award in 2017.

Early life
Roizman was raised in Brooklyn, and as a child, he wanted to be a baseball player, physicist, or mathematician. He had a tryout with the New York Yankees but contracted polio as a teenager. His father, Sol, was a cameraman for Movietone News, and upon hearing about the film industry's possible wages, Roizman decided, "I'm going for the money!" He began working during summer breaks at a camera rental store in New York City and later was an assistant to cinematographer Gerald Hirschfeld at MPO Videotronics.

Career
After creating several television commercials, Roizman made his feature film debut in 1970 with Stop. His second film, William Friedkin's The French Connection (1971), earned him an Academy Award nomination for Best Cinematography. The film set the style for many of his future films, with "gritty New York street photography" and available light.

Throughout the 1970s, he also worked on Play It Again, Sam (1972), The Heartbreak Kid (1972), The Exorcist (1973), Three Days of the Condor (1975), and Network (1976), among others, garnering Academy Award nominations for Best Cinematography for The Exorcist and Network. Roizman received two more Academy Award nominations, for Wyatt Earp (1994) and Tootsie (1982). His final film was Lawrence Kasdan's French Kiss (1995).

Roizman was a member of the Board of Governors of the Academy of Motion Picture Arts and Sciences from 2002 to 2011, representing the Cinematographers Branch, and was a member of the American Society of Cinematographers (ASC). Roizman was ASC president from 1997 to 1998 and served on its board. He received an Academy Honorary Award at the 9th Governors Awards ceremony in 2017.

Roizman was known for collaborating with film directors William Friedkin, Sydney Pollack, and Lawrence Kasdan.

Personal life and death
Roizman lived in the Encino neighborhood of Los Angeles with his wife, Mona. They had a son, Eric, who became a camera operator.

Roizman died under hospice care at his home on January 6, 2023, at the age of 86.

Filmography

Other awards

References

External links 
 

1936 births
2023 deaths
Academy Honorary Award recipients
American cinematographers
People from Brooklyn
People from Encino, Los Angeles